Narciso Yepes (14 November 19273 May 1997) was a Spanish guitarist. He is considered one of the finest virtuoso classical guitarists of the twentieth century.

Biography 
Yepes was born into a family of humble origin in Lorca, Region of Murcia. His father gave him his first guitar when he was four years old, and took the boy five miles on a donkey to and from lessons three days a week. Yepes took his first lessons from Jesús Guevara, in Lorca. Later his family moved to Valencia when the Spanish Civil War started in 1936.

When he was 13, he was accepted to study at the Conservatorio de Valencia with the pianist and composer Vicente Asencio. Here he followed courses in harmony, composition, and performance. Yepes is credited by many with developing the A-M-I technique of playing notes with the ring (Anular), middle (Medio), and index (Indice) fingers of the right hand. Guitar teachers traditionally taught their students to play by alternating the index and middle fingers, or I-M. However, since Yepes studied under teachers who were not guitarists, they pushed him to expand on the traditional technique. According to Yepes, Asencio "was a pianist who loathed the guitar because a guitarist couldn't play scales very fast and very legato, as on a piano or a violin. 'If you can't play like that,' he told me, 'you must take up another instrument.'" Through practice and improvement in his technique, Yepes could match Asencio's piano scales on the guitar. "'So,' he [Asencio] said, 'it's possible on the guitar. Now play that fast in thirds, then in chromatic thirds.'" Allan Kozinn observed that, "Thanks to Mr. Asencio's goading, Mr. Yepes learned "to play music the way I want, not the way the guitar wants." Similarly, the composer, violinist, and pianist George Enescu would also push Yepes to improve his technique, which also allowed him to play with greater speed.

On 16 December 1947 he made his Madrid début, performing Joaquín Rodrigo's Concierto de Aranjuez with Ataúlfo Argenta conducting the Spanish National Orchestra. The overwhelming success of this performance brought him renown from critics and public alike. Soon afterwards, he began to tour with Argenta, visiting Switzerland, Italy, Germany, and France. During this time he was largely responsible for the growing popularity of the Concierto de Aranjuez, and made two early recordings, both with Argenta – one in mono with the Madrid Chamber Orchestra (released between 1953 and 1955), and the second in stereo with the Orquesta Nacional de España (recorded in 1957 and released in 1959).

In 1950, after performing in Paris, he spent a year studying interpretation under the violinist George Enescu, and the pianist Walter Gieseking. He also studied informally with Nadia Boulanger. This was followed by a long period in Italy where he profited from contact with artists of every kind.

On 18 May 1951, as he leant on the parapet of a bridge in Paris and watched the Seine flow by, Yepes unexpectedly heard a voice inside him ask, "What are you doing?" He had been a nonbeliever for 25 years, perfectly content that there was no God or transcendence or afterlife. But that existential question, which he understood as God's call, changed everything for him. He became a devout Catholic, which he remained for the rest of his life.

In 1952 a work ("Romance"), Yepes claims to have written when he was a young boy, became the theme to the film Forbidden Games (Jeux interdits) by René Clément.

Despite Yepes's claims of composing it, the piece ("Romance") has often been attributed to other authors; indeed published versions exist from before Yepes was even born, and the earliest known recording of the work dates from a cylinder from around 1900. In the credits of the film Jeux Interdits, however, "Romance" is credited as "Traditional: arranged – Narciso Yepes."
Yepes also performed other pieces for the Forbidden Games soundtrack. His later credits as film composer include the soundtracks to La Fille aux yeux d'or (1961) and La viuda del capitán Estrada (1991). He also starred as a musician in the 1967 film version of El amor brujo.

In Paris he met Maria Szumlakowska, a young Polish philosophy student, the daughter of Marian Szumlakowski, the Ambassador of Poland in Spain from 1935 to 1944. They married in 1958 and had two sons, Juan de la Cruz (deceased), Ignacio Yepes, an orchestral conductor and flautist, and one daughter, Ana Yepes, a dancer and choreographer.

In 1964, Yepes performed the Concierto de Aranjuez with the Berlin Philharmonic Orchestra, premièring the ten-string guitar, which he invented in collaboration with the renowned guitar maker José Ramírez III.  The instrument made it possible to transcribe works originally written for baroque lute without deleterious transposition of the bass notes. However, the main reason for the invention of this instrument was the addition of string resonators tuned to C, A#, G#, F#, which resulted in the first guitar with truly chromatic string resonance – similar to that of the piano with its sustain/pedal mechanism.

After 1964, Yepes used the ten-string guitar exclusively, touring all six inhabited continents, performing in recitals as well as with the world's leading orchestras, giving an average of 130 performances each year. He recorded the Concierto de Aranjuez for the first time with the ten-string guitar in 1969 with Odón Alonso conducting the Orquesta Sinfonica R.T.V. Española.

Apart from being a consummate musician, Yepes was also a significant scholar. His research into forgotten manuscripts of the sixteenth and seventeenth centuries resulted in the rediscovery of numerous works for guitar or lute. He was also the first person to record the complete lute works of Bach on period instruments (14-course baroque lute). In addition, through his patient and intensive study of his instrument, Narciso Yepes developed a revolutionary technique and previously unsuspected resources and possibilities.

He was granted many official honours including the Gold Medal for Distinction in Arts, conferred by King Juan Carlos I; membership in the Academy of "Alfonso X el Sabio" and an Honorary Doctorate from the University of Murcia. In 1986 he was awarded the Premio Nacional de Música of Spain, and he was elected unanimously to the Real Academia de Bellas Artes de San Fernando.

In the 1980s, Yepes formed Trio Yepes with his son Ignacio Yepes on flute and recorder and his daughter Ana dancing to her own choreography.

After 1993, Narciso Yepes limited his public appearances due to illness. He gave his last concert on 1 March 1996 in Santander (Spain).

He died in Murcia in 1997, after a long battle with lymphoma.

Press quotes 
As one writer has observed, "His [Yepes'] taking advantage of the instrument's flexibility has opened Yepes to some criticism," citing Bach's Chaconne in D Minor as an example. Yepes responded that, "There are three versions of the Chaconne and I analyzed all three. The version I play is the one I think Bach would have written if he'd composed the piece for guitar or lute."

Guitarist and teacher Ivor Mairants noted that after a Yepes concert at Wigmore Hall in 1961, some in the audience were split about Yepes' phrasing. Mairants, who had started as a jazz guitarist but took up the classical guitar and had two lessons with Segovia, met with Yepes afterwards and questioned him about his phrasing, which was very different from Segovia's. In his memoir, Mairants wrote, "I exclaimed 'Do you think it necessary to play that section (of Villa Lobos' Prelude No. 1) as slowly as you do?' 'Why, yes' he (Yepes) said, 'Look at the paper (music) and you will see it written that way'. When I again mentioned that Segovia did not play it that way, he had no doubt had enough of my comparisons and answered, somewhat heatedly 'I have a great admiration for Segovia and everything he has done for the guitar and its history, but I do not have to put on a record of Segovia and play the music exactly as he does. No, I don't think so!'" Elsewhere, Yepes was quoted as saying, "Segovia is a very beautiful player, but it is not necessary to imitate him. Why should Rostropovich imitate Casals?"

Positive 
"Narciso Yepes gave a most delicate account of Rodrigo's Concierto de Aranjuez. The range of timbres he can produce, to contrast phrases and to shape them, is astonishing . . . The work is not worthy of such playing."
"Guitar concerts in Carnegie Hall can be a frustrating affair. Narciso Yepes brought his 10-string invention there last Thursday, and suddenly it was not a problem hearing that instrument in that space. His guitar fills the hall with sound. The musician who plucks it is one of the finest in the world today. ... One left his recital stimulated and elated, with nary a thought as to the potential limitations of the instrument, dynamically or musically." (1982)
"Mr. Yepes' playing was distinguished by its clarity of detail, particularly in the ornaments, and facility of the passage-work. He was also able to sustain contrapuntal lines by some devilish trick, and he used color, not like Segovia, for its sensual appeal, but to help underline phrases and structural details ... Yepes had poetry and power in large measure and flexibility of rhythm that was a total contradiction to the tight beat he kept. Mr. Yepes' startling performing magnetism is a natural product of his technical mastery..."
"With a rare intelligence and sensibility, Narciso Yepes conveyed to his audience that powerful silencing of all the critical spirit that only really great performers can bestow."
"Such incomparable artistry, coupled with staggering technical virtuosity, is rare among artists today."
"Yepes is more than a brilliant virtuoso and more than a consummate musician ... he is a magician who needs no more than a rhythm or a chord to bring all under his power."
"He is a consummate technician and a knowledgeable interpreter in a variety of guitar idioms, from the Renaissance and Baroque to the Modern ... His attributes as a well-disciplined master of the guitar are of the first rank."
"Other fine guitarists have visited Japan, but none of them, not even Segovia, revealed such delicacy and beauty in the instrument."
"...We consider Yepes the most complete guitarist of our times."
"An admirable musician, a master of his instrument ... his interpretations are solidly built up and are not affected by the slightest trace of sentiment ... The audience showed their enthusiasm by their eager and well-deserved applause and foot-stomping. Certainly merited".
"His musical personality is of the widest possible scope. It took no more than three opening pieces to establish Mr. Yepes as a vibrant, sensual, searching and highly articulate performer."
"If the poetry of the guitar lies in its evocative colors, then Narciso Yepes stands among the supreme poets of the instrument. Throughout his recital Sunday afternoon in Orchestra Hall, Yepes created a range of sonority, color and inflection that only a few guitarists performing today could equal."
"An engaging and empathetic personality made Yepes an unusually persuasive teacher, particularly in the public format of a masterclass. Never an authoritarian, he reached his students' minds with a judicious mixture of humor and information that greatly facilitated the learning process. An invariable custom was to draw more attention to a student's strong points than to the weak. As he put it, 'As you grow in your strengths, you will forget your weaknesses.'" 
"... we finally have a real departure from the Segovia style of playing, not an echo."
"For this reviewer his performance was more varied, more enjoyable, more virtuosic than that of even the legendary Segovia."
"Flawless, lilting melodies rained from the unique ten-string guitar ... Here and there were flashes of the fire and passion of Spain but more generally the selections were softer, dreamier, lute-like, making it easy for the listener in the warm, still theater to feel transported to a sun-kissed far-away land where a gentle sirocco fluttered through exotic flower petals and ruffled mantilla laces."
"... the three sonatas by Scarlatti offered an opportunity for the performer to delight his audience with his unusually wide range of tonal colors ... Narciso Yepes' playing in every detail was impeccable ... "  85
"Yepes dazzled the audience with his insightful and technically brilliant playing."
"This is a connoisseur's "Aranjuez," full of willful departures from the text, rhythmic freedoms and subjective coloring by Mr. Yepes, and a thorough rebalancing of the orchestra accompaniment by conductor Garcia Navarro." (Allan Kozinn, New York Times, 15 Feb 1981)
"Narciso Yepes is not only an outstanding exponent of this repertoire, he also has the rare gift of consistently creating electricity in the recording studio, and all this music springs vividly to life."
"A concert with the Paris Conservatoire Orchestra [i.e., Yepes' Paris debut] ... included a splendidly restrained performance with Narciso Yepes of Joaquín Rodrigo's Guitar Concerto. This must surely be the only successful concerto written for the instrument. The beautiful balance of ideas and harmonies, the sensitive atmosphere and orchestration are an ever fresh delight."
"Narciso Yepes is my favorite guitarist, that is, outside of the [Romero] family. And of course, Bream, I enjoy him. But the one I enjoy the most is Narciso Yepes."
"Yepes' triumph Saturday night was in his right hand. (His bowing, one might say.) He commands a wide variety of tonal quality, thanks to some extent to his vibrato and tonal shading on the fingerboard, but mostly to the careful and accurate positioning of his plucking fingers: now on the bridge, now over the sound-hole, again on the fingerboard itself."
"It seemed as though everyone in the audience had stopped breathing during the Adagio movement of Joaquin Rodrigo's 'Concierto de Aranjuez,' played by Yepes with such delicacy, with such attention to nuance and with such clarity of beauty as to captivate me and everyone present."

Neutral/negative 
"Compared with the more flowing style of his older contemporary, Andrés Segovia [...], Mr. Yepes's style could sound oddly clipped, yet his admirers pointed out that his approach allowed counterpoint to emerge with a clarity unusual on the guitar."
"Yepes is, of course, a thoroughly accomplished performer, but in this repertory he seems a bit too cool and, at times, even mechanical. Certainly his account of the famous Chaconne, if more rhythmically stable than Segovia's, has none of the rich panoply of colors that Segovia produced. Then, too, the three-note figurations that comprise the E Prelude are plucked out with a stiff rigidity lacking the nuance and legato phrasing that Julian Bream [...]" 
"Yepes, for all his wonderful technique, seems quite removed from the music."
"[...]  [other guitarist's] exciting and perceptive performances of the lute works, which were recorded between 1981 and 1984, are light years better than the stilted, drab, and often utterly stillborn interpretations of Narciso Yepes, who does not sound by any means comfortable playing the lute."
"Spanish guitarist Narciso Yepes (1927–97) was one of the oddest high-profile players active in the second half of the century. He adhered to no school and seems to have had few followers. His playing on his numerous Deutsche Grammophon recordings is almost always inexplicably quirky, with crisp, staccato articulation, square phrasing, metronomic rhythms, and interpretations that can be eerily devoid of expression."
"The Yepes interpretive hallmarks are all here: crisp articulation, square phrasing, and metronomic regularity. It always struck me as very odd that this elder statesman among Spanish guitarists could produce such mannered and stiff renditions of these Iberian favorites. It seems almost as though Yepes deliberately sought to position himself as the antidote to Segovian excesses. [...] But the guitar world is richer for having had a Yepes. Such polar opposites stir things up and encourage critical reappraisals of interpretive traditions. [...] his approach just falls flat, as in most of the other Spanish standards by Albeniz, Granados, and company. Yepes often seems determined to make this music neither exciting nor romantic.[...] if you are interested in building your library, there are dozens of other recordings of this standard fare that you would be better off with."
"Narciso Yepes is a clean-fingered (though not infallible) player with a rather academic approach" 
"Respectfully, I cannot place Yepes on the same level with Segovia and Bream." (Angelo Gilardino,
"controversially different" 
"The Spaniard Narciso Yepes, now, is famous, as much for his occasional lapses as for his occasional excellences. Both sides of Yepes are usually on display" 
"Yepes can be downright unmusical in his pedantic interpretations of some pieces [...], yet stunning – musically and technically – in other pieces." (Classical Music: The Listener's Companion by Alexander J. Morin, Harold C. Schonberg)
"The suite by Falckenhagen and the two Scarlatti sonata transcriptions – both clean and cool in their symmetry – seemed burdened to the point of stumbling by Mr. Yepes's rhapsodic pauses and surges. [...] In three Villa-Lobos studies, however, Mr. Yepes's generosity of phrase found sympathetic and grateful recipients."<ref>"Music Noted in Brief; Narciso Yepes Plays A Guitar Recital at Met",; Bernard Holland, 'New York Times, 10 November 1986]</ref>
"Other American critics have called attention to the 'dry sherry style' that distinguishes Yepes' recordings ..."
"But even here his [Yepes'] heart was always ruled by his head, and he also seemed to prefer a crisp, dry texture to the cantabile which many guitarists try to coax from their instruments."
"Mr. Yepes is a faithful product of the hot, dry Andalucian climate, and his playing has little of the refinement that English listeners associate with the classical guitar. His rhythms are tense and urgent, his phrasing stylized in emphasis, his tone kaleidoscopic but favouring the plangency that non-Iberian players reserve for special effect."
"There is a rhythmic imprecision, for example, which occasionally develops into a pronounced instability in keeping the meter recognizable. Slightly delayed attacks, performed for expressive purposes, accumulate until the sense of the beat is gone. This sort of thing is acceptable, even idiomatic, in a fantasy or a caprice; but it is out of keeping in the dance movement of a Bach Suite."

 Recordings (partial) 
Recordings at Deutsche Grammophon Gesellschaft

"La Fille aux Yeux d'Or" (original film soundtrack) (Fontana, 460.805)
"Narciso Yepes: Bacarisse/Torroba" (Concertos) (London, CCL 6001)
"Jeux Interdits" (Original film soundtrack) (London, Kl 320)
"Narciso Yepes: Recital" (London, CCL 6002)
"Falla/Rodrigo" (Concierto de Aranjuez) (London, CS 6046)
"Spanish Classical Guitar Music" (London, KL 303)
"Vivaldi/Bach/Palau" (Conciertos & Chaconne)(London, CS 6201)
"Guitar Recital: Vol. 2" (London, KL 304)
"Rodrigo/Ohana" (Concertos) (London, CS 6356)
"Guitar Recital: Vol. 3" (London, KL 305)
"The World of the Spanish Guitar Vol. 2" (London, STS 15306)
"Simplemente" (re-release of early recordings) (MusicBrokers, MBB 5191)
"Guitar Music Of Spain" (LP Contour cc7584)
"Recital Amerique Latine & Espagne" (Forlane, UCD 10907)
"Les Grands d'Espagne, Vol. 4" (Forlane, UM 3903)
"Les Grands d'Espagne, Vol. 5" (Forlane, UM 3907)
"Fernando Sor – 24 Etudes" (Deutsche Grammophon, 139 364)
"Spanische Gitarrenmusik aus fünf Jahrhunderten, Vol. 1" (Deutsche Grammophon, 139 365)
"Spanische Gitarrenmusik aus fünf Jahrhunderten, Vol. 2" (Deutsche Grammophon, 139 366)
"Joaquín Rodrigo: Concierto de Aranjuez, Fantasía para un Gentilhombre" (Deutsche Grammophon, 139 440)
"Rendezvous mit Narciso Yepes" (Deutsche Grammophon, 2538 106)
"Luigi Boccerini: Gitarren-Quintette" (Deutsche Grammophon, 2530 069 & 429 512–2)
"J.S. Bach – S.L. Weiss" (Deutsche Grammophon, 2530 096)
"Heitor Villa-Lobos" (Deutsche Grammophon, 2530 140 & 423 700–2)
"Música Española" (Deutsche Grammophon, 2530 159)
"Antonio Vivaldi" (Concertos) (Deutsche Grammophon, 2530 211 & 429 528–2)
"Música Catalana" (Deutsche Grammophon, 2530 273)
"Guitarra Romantica" (Deutsche Grammophon, 2530 871)
"Johann Sebastian Bach: Werke für Laute" (Works for Lute – Complete Recording on Period Instruments) (Deutsche Grammophon, 2708 030)

"Francisco Tárrega" (Deutsche Grammophon, 410 655–2)
"Joaquín Rodrigo" (Guitar Solos) (Deutsche Grammophon, 419 620–2)
"Romance d'Amour" (Deutsche Grammophon, 423 699–2)
"Canciones españolas I" (Deutsche Grammophon, 435 849–2)
"Canciones españolas II" (Deutsche Grammophon, 435 850–2)
"Rodrigo/Bacarisse" (Concertos) (Deutsche Grammophon, 439 5262)
"Johann Sebastian Bach: Werke für Laute" (Works for Lute – Recording on Ten-String Guitar) (Deutsche Grammophon, 445 714–2 & 445 715–2)
"Johann Sebastian Bach: Werke für Laute II" (Works for Lute II - Recording on Ten-String Guitar) (Deutsche Grammophon 1974, 2530 462)
"Rodrigo/Halffter/Castelnuovo-Tedesco" (Concertos) (Deutsche Grammophon, 449 098-2)
"Domenico Scarlatti: Sonatas" (Deutsche Grammophon, 457 325–2 & 413 783–2)
"Guitar Recital" (Deutsche Grammophon, 459 565–2)
"Asturias: Art of the Guitar" (Deutsche Grammophon, 459 613–2)
"Narciso Yepes" (Collectors Edition box set) (Deutsche Grammophon, 474 667–2 to 474 671–2)
"20th Century Guitar Works" (Deutsche Grammophon)
"Guitar Music of Five Centuries" (Deutsche Grammophon)
"G.P. Telemann" (Duos with Godelieve Monden) (Deutsche Grammophon)
"Guitar Duos" (with Godelieve Monden) (BMG)
"Leonardo Balada: Symphonies" ('Persistencies') (Albany, TROY474)
"The Beginning of a Legend: Studio Recordings 1953/1957" (Istituto Discografico Italiano, 6620)
"The Beginning of a Legend vol. 2: Studio Recordings 1960" (Istituto Discografico Italiano, 6625)
"The Beginning of a Legend vol. 3: Studio Recordings 1960/1963" (Istituto Discografico Italiano, 6701)

 Works composed for or dedicated to Narciso Yepes (partial) 
 Estanislao Marco: Guajira
 Joaquín Rodrigo: En los trigales (1939) [Since Yepes was only 12 years old when Rodrigo wrote En los trigales, it is unlikely that it was written for Yepes. It was likely dedicated to him in the 1950s, when Rodrigo included it and two other pieces as the suite Por los campos de España''.
 Manuel Palau: Concierto levantino
 Manuel Palau: Ayer
 Manuel Palau: Sonata
 Salvador Bacarisse: Concertino in A-minor
 Salvador Bacarisse: Suite
 Salvador Bacarisse: Ballade
 Maurice Ohana: Tiento (1955)
 Maurice Ohana: Concerto "Trois Graphiques" (1950–7)
 Maurice Ohana: Si le jou paraît... (1963)
 Cristóbal Halffter: Codex 1 (1963)
 Leo Brouwer: Tarantos
 Alcides Lanza: Modulos I (1965)
 Leonardo Balada: Guitar Concerto No. 1 (1965)
 Antonio Ruiz-Pipó: Cinqo Movimientos (1965)
 Antonio Ruiz-Pipó: Canciones y Danzas (1961)
 Leonardo Balada: Analogías (1967)
 Leon Schidlowsky: Interludio (1968)
 Eduardo Sainz de la Maza: Laberinto (1968)
 Antonio Ruiz-Pipó: "Tablas" Concerto (1968–69/72)
 Vicente Asencio: Collectici íntim (1970)
 Vicente Asencio: Suite de Homenajes
 Bruno Maderna: Y después (1971)
 Leonardo Balada: "Persistencias" Sinfonía-concertante (1972)
 Jorge Labrouve: Enigma op. 9 (1974)
 Jorge Labrouve: Juex op. 12 (Concertino) (1975)
 Luigi Donorà: Rito (1975)
 Tomás Marco: Concierto "Eco" (1976–78)
 Francisco Casanovas: La gata i el belitre
 Miguel Ángel Cherubito: Suite popular Argentina
 José Peris: Elegía
 Xavier Montsalvatge: Metamorfosis de Concierto (1980)
 Jean Françaix: Concerto pour guitare et orchestre à cordes (1982)
 Xavier Montsalvatge: Fantasía para guitarra y arpa (1983)
 Federico Mompou: Canço i dansa no. 13
 Alan Hovhaness: Concerto No. 2 for Guitar and Strings, Op. 394 (1985)
 María de la Concepción Lebrero Baena: Remembranza de Juan de la Cruz (1989)

References

External links 
International Jose Guillermo Carrillo Foundation
Official Homepage www.narcisoyepes.org
Biography (Conservatorio de Música "Narciso Yepes" Lorca (Murcia) España)
[ Biography] by Robert Cummings (Allmusic)
Information (Región de Murcia Digital) 
Biography (Guitarreando) 
Biography (A.MA.MUS. es una Asociación de Maestros de Música) 
Information (Esperanto)
Narciso Yepes receiving Doctores Honoris Causa at Universidad de Murcia (audio )
Entrevista Con Narciso Yepes (includes audio interview) by Manuel Segura; Murcia, February 1988 
αφιέρωμα για τα 80 χρόνια από τη γέννηση του Narciso Yepes (Tar) 
 
https://www.youtube.com/watch?v=TWJfF0XegAw Narciso Yepes explains his authorship of the Romance
 www.tenstringguitar.info Site about the authentic Yepes ten-string guitar

Articles 
Narciso Yepes en el recuerdo by Antonio Díaz Bautista (laverdad.es) 
Narciso Yepes y su legado olvidado (laverdad.es)

Recordings 
Recordings at Deutsche Grammophon Gesellschaft
Some photos of LP covers (Oviatt Library Digital Collections)
Joaquín Rodrigo – Concierto de Aranjuez by Narciso Yepes

1927 births
1997 deaths
People from Murcia
Converts to Roman Catholicism from atheism or agnosticism
Inventors of musical instruments
Musicians from the Region of Murcia
Spanish classical guitarists
Spanish male guitarists
Spanish film score composers
Male film score composers
Spanish lutenists
Spanish Roman Catholics
20th-century classical composers
20th-century composers
London Records artists
Deutsche Grammophon artists
20th-century Spanish musicians
20th-century guitarists
20th-century Spanish male musicians
Deaths from cancer in Spain
Deaths from lymphoma